Nok Kundi Railway Station (Balochi:نوک کنڈی ریلوے اسٹیشن) is  located in Nok Kundi, Balochistan,  Pakistan.

See also
 List of railway stations in Pakistan
 Pakistan Railways

References

External links

Railway stations on Quetta–Taftan Railway Line
Railway stations in Balochistan, Pakistan